The Rising Night is an exclusive to audio Doctor Who story, produced as part of BBC Books' New Series Adventures line, and was the fourth entry in the series to be produced.

Written by Scott Handcock and read by Michelle Ryan, it features the Tenth Doctor and was published in July 2009.

It is set after the events of "Journey's End" and sees the TARDIS arrive in an 18th-century village on the Yorkshire Moors, where livestock has been vanishing from the farmland and strange lights have been seen in the skies.

References

External links
 EZ Audiobooks

Audiobooks based on Doctor Who
Tenth Doctor audio plays
2009 audio plays
Yorkshire in fiction
Works by Scott Handcock